Julien Xavier Neals (born January 1, 1965) is an American lawyer serving as a United States district judge of the United States District Court for the District of New Jersey.

Education 

Neals received a Bachelor of Arts from Morehouse College in 1986. He received a Juris Doctor from Emory University School of Law in 1991.

Career 
He began his legal career as a law clerk to Judge Seymour Margulies of the New Jersey Superior Court in Hudson County from 1991 to 1992. From 1992 to 2006 and in 2014, he worked at Chasan, Leyner & Lamparello, P.C., in Secaucus, New Jersey, first as an associate, and later as a partner, where he practiced general litigation in state and federal courts. From 2006 to 2014, he worked for the City of Newark, as Chief Judge of the Newark Municipal Court from 2006 to 2008, as Corporation Counsel from 2008 to 2010, and as Business Administrator from 2010 to 2014. From January 2015 until his confirmation, he served as County Counsel for Bergen County.

Federal judicial service

Expired nomination to district court under Obama 

On February 26, 2015, President Barack Obama nominated Neals to serve as a United States District Judge of the United States District Court for the District of New Jersey, to the seat vacated by Judge Faith S. Hochberg, who retired on March 6, 2015.
He received a hearing before the Judiciary Committee on September 30, 2015. On November 5, 2015, his nomination was favorably reported out of committee by voice vote. However, Senate Majority Leader Mitch McConnell refused to schedule the nomination for a Senate vote. The nomination expired on January 3, 2017, with the end of the 114th Congress.

Renomination to district court under Biden 

On March 30, 2021, President Joe Biden announced his intent to renominate Neals to serve as a United States district judge for the United States District Court for the District of New Jersey. On April 19, 2021, his nomination was sent to the Senate. President Biden nominated Neals to the seat vacated by Judge William J. Martini, who assumed senior status on February 10, 2015. Neals was recommended by Senator Cory Booker. On April 28, 2021, a hearing on his nomination was held before the Senate Judiciary Committee. On May 20, 2021, his nomination was reported out of committee by a 16–6 vote. On June 7, 2021, the United States Senate invoked cloture on Neals' nomination by a 66–28 vote. On June 8, 2021, his nomination was confirmed by a 66–33 vote. He received his judicial commission on June 22, 2021.

See also 
 List of African-American federal judges
 List of African-American jurists

References

External links 
 
 

1965 births
Living people
20th-century American lawyers
21st-century American judges
21st-century American lawyers
African-American judges
African-American lawyers
Emory University School of Law alumni
Judges of the United States District Court for the District of New Jersey
Lawyers from Newark, New Jersey
Morehouse College alumni
New Jersey lawyers
New Jersey state court judges
State attorneys
United States district court judges appointed by Joe Biden